Donald Edward Hudson (November 20, 1929 – September 30, 2018) was an American football player and coach.  He served as the head football coach at Macalester College from 1972 to 1975 and at Lincoln University in Jefferson City, Missouri from 1976 to 1979, compiling a career college football record of 9–72–2.  When he was hired at Macalester, Hudson became first African-American head football coach at a predominantly white college in the modern era.

Hudson became the head coach in December 1971 when his predecessor, Dick Borstad, resigned. Macalester College barely publicized the milestone. As a result, other predominantly white schools were subsequently reported to have hired the first African-American head football coach in the modern era: Portland State University with the hiring of Ron Stratten in 1972 and Oberlin College with the hiring of Cass Jackson in 1973. Hudson was recognized for his breakthrough at half time of a Macalester game in October 2007.

Hudson played college football as a quarterback for Lincoln University and was an assistant coach there through the 1950s and 1960s. He was offered a head coaching job at Minneapolis Central High School, where he was the first African-American coach in that school's league. He then took a coaching and teaching job at predominantly white Macalester College in 1971. He went 3–36 in his first four seasons as head coach at Macalester.

Head coaching record

College

Further reading
 Weiner, Jay. Macalester's Hudson: The First, but Forgotten Until Now. ESPN, February 13, 2008.
 Blount, Rachel. Macalester's Don Hudson: An Overdue Honor.Star Tribune. Minneapolis, MN, October 4, 2007.

References

1929 births
2018 deaths
American football quarterbacks
Lincoln Blue Tigers athletic directors
Lincoln Blue Tigers football coaches
Lincoln Blue Tigers football players
Macalester Scots football coaches
High school football coaches in Minnesota
Sportspeople from Pittsburgh
Players of American football from Pittsburgh
African-American coaches of American football
African-American players of American football
20th-century African-American sportspeople
21st-century African-American people